Pétillon is a Brussels Metro station on the eastern branch of line 5. It is located in the municipality of Etterbeek, in the eastern part of Brussels, Belgium.

The station opened in 1976 and is named after Major Pétillon, a Belgian colonial pioneer who died in Etterbeek in 1909. The station underwent an eighteen-month, €6.3 million renovation ending in April 2008.

The nearby tram station that bears the same name is visited by tram lines 7 and 25.

References

External links

Etterbeek
Brussels metro stations
Railway stations opened in 1976